Ayu Diandra Sari Tjakra (born 4 August 1988) is an Indonesian presenter, doctor, fashion model and a Beauty pageant titleholder who won the title of Puteri Indonesia Lingkungan 2008. She represented Indonesia at the Miss International 2009 pageant in Chengdu, China.

Early life and education
Ayu was born in Denpasar, Bali from a traditional Balinese-Hindu parents. She holds a magister degree in Doctor of Medicine from Faculty of Medicine of Udayana University, Denpasar – Bali.

Pageantry

Puteri Indonesia 2008
Ayu representing Bali on Puteri Indonesia 2008, where she was crowned as Puteri Indonesia Lingkungan 2008 at the grand finale held in Jakarta Convention Center, Jakarta, Indonesia on 15 August 2008, by the outgoing titleholder of Puteri Indonesia Lingkungan 2007, Duma Riris Silalahi of North Sumatra.

Miss International 2009
As Puteri Indonesia Lingkungan 2008, Ayu represented Indonesia at the 49th edition of Miss International 2009 pageant held in Sichuan International Tennis Center, Chengdu, Sichuan, China. The finale was held on 28 November 2009. She is wearing one-piece swimsuit during swimwear competition. She is also wearing kebaya designed by Anne Avantie as her national costume.

Filmography

Talk show

See also
 Miss International
 Miss International 2009
 Puteri Indonesia 2008
 Zivanna Letisha Siregar

References

External links

 Puteri Indonesia official website
 Miss International official website
 Ayu Diandra Sari Tjakra Official Instagram

Living people
1988 births
Udayana University alumni
Puteri Indonesia winners
Miss International 2009 delegates
Indonesian beauty pageant winners
Indonesian female models
Indonesian Hindus
Indonesian activists
Health activists
People from Bali
People from Denpasar
Balinese people